Tamara Boroš (born 19 December 1977) is a Croatian table tennis player. She is one of the relatively rare European players who competed at the highest level of the sport together with the players from the Far East.

Boroš was born in a Hungarian family in Senta. As a junior, she played for the local table tennis club STK Senta. After the outbreak of Yugoslav Wars in 1991, she stayed in Sweden, finally settling in Zagreb, Croatia with her parents in 1993. Neven Cegnar became her new coach.

Boroš was the World's number 2 player in 2002. At the World Championship in Paris in 2003 she won the bronze medal, and became the first European to win a WC medal after ten years. Only three non-Asian players won medals at the World Championship between 1973 and 2005.

She won 12 medals at the European Table Tennis Championships. In 1998 she won silver, and in 2000, 2002 and 2005 she won the bronze medal in women's singles. She is a three-time European Champion in women's doubles (2002, 2003 and 2005). With the Croatian national team she won silver medals in 2003 and 2005, and bronze in 2000, 2008 and 2009.

At the Mediterranean Games she won a gold medal in 2001 and 2005, and a silver medal in 1997 in the women's singles event. She won a gold medal in 1997 in the women's doubles event.

Boroš retired from competitive table tennis in 2012.

In 2015, Boroš was inducted into the European Table Tennis Hall of Fame.

References

External links
 Table tennis results
  (a 2013 documentary film about Tamara Boroš, in Croatian, with English subtitles)

1977 births
Living people
People from Senta
Croatian female table tennis players
Croatian table tennis coaches
Table tennis players at the 1996 Summer Olympics
Table tennis players at the 2000 Summer Olympics
Table tennis players at the 2004 Summer Olympics
Table tennis players at the 2008 Summer Olympics
Olympic table tennis players of Croatia
Mediterranean Games gold medalists for Croatia
Mediterranean Games silver medalists for Croatia
Competitors at the 1997 Mediterranean Games
Competitors at the 2001 Mediterranean Games
Competitors at the 2005 Mediterranean Games
Mediterranean Games medalists in table tennis
Croatian expatriate sportspeople in Austria
Croatian expatriate sportspeople in Germany
Croatian people of Hungarian descent
Serbian emigrants to Croatia
Yugoslav Wars refugees
Hungarians in Vojvodina